Karl Otto Heinrich Liebmann  (* 22. October 1874 in Strasbourg; † 12. June 1939 in Munich-Solln) was a German mathematician and geometer.

Life 
Liebmann was the son of Otto Liebmann (1840–1912), a Jewish neo-Kantian philosophy professor in Jena. Heinrich studied from 1895 to 1897 at the universities Leipzig, Jena and Göttingen. In 1895 he was awarded the doctorate under Carl Johannes Thomae with the subject Die einzweideutigen projektiven Punktverwandtschaften der Ebene  and passed the Lehramtsprüfung in 1896. In 1897 he was an assistant in Göttingen and in 1898 in Leipzig, where he was habilitated on the subject Über die Verbiegung der geschlossenen Flächen positiver Krümmung. In this work, among other things, he stated Liebmann's theorem in differential geometry.

In 1905, he became extraordinary professor in Leipzig, in 1910 extraordinary professor at the Technischen Hochschule München, where he became professor in 1915. In 1920 he followed Paul Stäckel as professor at the Universität Heidelberg, where he became rector in 1926 and dean of the faculty of mathematics and natural science in 1923/1924 as well as in 1928/1929. In 1935 he asked for retirement due to political pressure of the national socialists because of Liebmann's Jewish ancestry. He and his colleague Arthur Rosenthal were boycotted in his faculty. He spent his last years in Munich.

In 1913 he married his first wife Natalie Liebmann, née Kraus († 1924), who was the daughter of Karl Kraus, professor of agricultural science in Munich. After the death of his first wife he married Helene Ehlers. He had four children.

Liebmann was concerned, among other things, with differential geometry and non-Euclidean geometry. He discovered the construction of a triangle from its three angles by circle and ruler within hyperbolic geometry. In his habilitation, he showed that a convex closed surface cannot be bent (theorem of Minding and Liebmann's theorem). He translated the works of Nikolai Lobachevsky into German.

Liebmann was a member of the Saxon Academy of Sciences, the Bavarian Academy of Sciences and Humanities and the Heidelberg Academy of Sciences and Humanities.

Works (selection) 
 Die einzweideutigen projektiven Punktverwandtschaften der Ebene. Jena, 1895 (Digitalisat Univ. Heidelberg)
 Über die Verbiegung der geschlossenen Flächen positiver Krümmung Leipzig 1900 (Digitalisat Univ. Heidelberg)
 Lehrbuch der Differentialgleichungen. Leipzig 1901
 Die nichteuklidische Geometrie. Historisch kritische Darstellung ihrer Entwicklung. Berlin 1908, 1912, 1923 (zusammen mit Roberto Bonola) 
 Synthetische Geometrie. Leipzig 1934
 Nichteuklidische Geometrie. Leipzig 1905.
 Das Problem der Kreisteilung. Leipzig/Berlin 1913.
 Die Berührungstransformationen, Geschichte und Invariantentheorie. Leipzig 1914.
 Die Sätze von Lie und Gambier über Kurven deines Linienkomplexes. Berlin 1928.
 N. J. Lobatschefskijs imaginäre Geometrie und Anwendung der imaginären Geometrie auf einige Integrale, 1904
 „Eine neue Eigenschaft der Kugel“, Mitteilungen Akademie Göttingen 1899
 Die elementaren Konstruktionen der nichteuklidischen Geometrie, Jahresbericht DMV 1911
 „Notwendigkeit und Freiheit in der Mathematik“, Jahresbericht DMV 1905, Antrittsvorlesung Leipzig
 „Neuer Beweis des Mindingschen Satzes“, Jahresbericht DMV 1903
 „Neuer Beweis des Satzes, dass eine geschlossene konvexe Fläche sich nicht verbiegen läßt“, Mathematische Annalen Bd.54, 1901
 „Geometrische Theorie der Differentialgleichungen“, Enzyklopädie der Mathematischen Wissenschaften 1914
 „Berührungstransformationen“,  Enzyklopädie der Mathematischen Wissenschaften 1914

Bibliography 
 
 Siegfried Gottwald, Hans J. Ilgauds, Karl H. Schlote (Hrsg.): Lexikon bedeutender Mathematiker. Bibliographisches Institut, Leipzig 1990, .
 Gabriele Dörflinger: Heinrich Liebmann – Mathematiker. In: Badische Biographien, Neue Folge, Band 6 (2011), S. 258–259. (Manuskript.)
 Dorothee Mußgnug: Die vertriebenen Heidelberger Dozenten : zur Geschichte der Ruprecht-Karls-Universität nach 1933. Heidelberg 1988
 Heinrich Liebmann: Die Notwendigkeit der Freiheit in der Mathematik (Leipziger Antrittsvorlesung) in: Herbert Beckert, Walter Purkert Leipziger mathematische Antrittsvorlesungen. Auswahl aus den Jahren 1869-1922, B. G. Teubner, Leipzig 1987 (mit Biografie)

External links 
 Biography at University Heidelberg
 Heinrich Liebmann at University Leipzig

References 

1874 births
1939 deaths
19th-century German mathematicians
20th-century German mathematicians
University of Jena alumni
Academic staff of Leipzig University
Academic staff of the Technical University of Munich
Academic staff of Heidelberg University